The Croix de guerre des théâtres d'opérations extérieurs (War Cross for foreign operational theatres), also called the Croix de Guerre TOE for short, is a French military award denoting citations earned in combat in foreign countries.  The Armistice of November 11, 1918 ended the war between France and Germany, but French soldiers continued fighting in theatres outside metropolitan France.  Combat operations continued in Syria, Palestine, Constantinople, Morocco, French West Africa and French Equatorial Africa.

History
A law was passed on April 30, 1921 establishing the new Croix de guerre for "Théâtres d'opérations extérieurs" (TOE).  It was intended to commemorate the individual citations awarded during operations carried out since November 11, 1918 or that would occur in the future, for war service directly related to an expeditionary force used outside of the borders of France, otherwise, the statute of the Croix de guerre TOE was the same as that of the 1914 - 1918 Croix de guerre.

Following the combat operations of the immediate post World War 1 Era, the Croix de Guerre TOE was again awarded for actions in Indochina, Madagascar, Korea, and during the Suez Crisis.

After a hiatus of thirty-five years, it was again awarded for actions between January 17, 1991 and May 5, 1992 during the Gulf War (Order of Minister of Defence of 17 January 1991).  It was also extended to military operations conducted in Kosovo in 1999.

Statute
The award criteria for the Croix de Guerre TOE are substantially the same as those governing the Croix de Guerre 1914-1918, the citations for the entire armed forces are made by the Minister of Defense unless this authority has been specially delegated to the commanding general of the expeditionary forces.

The Croix de Guerre TOE is awarded to military personnel and civilians who have received an individual citation during war/combat operations on foreign soil.  More precisely, it was awarded for citations earned in the following operational foreign theatres:
 The Levant in 1918 and 1919, in the East from 1918 to 1920 in Morocco in 1918;
 French Equatorial Africa (AEF) in 1919;
 French West Africa (FWA) from 1918 to 1921;
 Morocco (Rif War) of 1921-1926;
 Indochina in 1918-1922 and 1945–1954;
 for military missions in the Baltic countries (Estonia, Latvia, Lithuania), Upper Silesia, Poland, Czechoslovakia, Russia, the Caucasus, Siberia, Hungary and Romania;
 Madagascar in 1947;
 Korea from 1950 to 1953;
 The Middle East (Egypt from 30 October 1956 to 31 December 1956 and the Gulf War of 17 January 1991 to 5 May 1992);
 Federal Republic of Yugoslavia (Kosovo from 24 March 1999 to 21 June 1999).

For naval citations, their levels differ from the army as follows:
 army level = made by a vice-admiral commander in chief of a naval force or fleet;
 corps level = made by a vice-admiral commanding a naval squadron;
 divisional level = made by a rear-admiral commanding an independent naval division;
 brigade level = made by a rear-admiral or captain commanding a naval division;
 regimental level = made by the senior officer commanding a vessel or a naval force other than those mentioned above.

Description

Cross
The Croix de guerre des théâtres d'opérations extérieures is a bronze 37 mm wide cross pattée, between the arms, two crossed swords pointing upward.  It was designed by the sculptor Albert Bartholome.  On the obverse in a circular medallion, the effigy of the Republic (Marianne) wearing a cap decorated with a laurel wreath, surrounded by a ring bearing the legend: "RÉPUBLIQUE FRANÇAISE".  On the reverse, in the circular medallion the inscription: "THÉÂTRES D'OPÉRATIONS EXTÉRIEURS".

The cross is suspended by a ring through the suspension loop to a 38 mm wide grey silk moiré ribbon with 10 mm wide red edge stripes.  The Croix de guerre TOE is worn on the left side of the chest and when in the presence of other medals of France, is located immediately after the Croix de guerre 1939 - 1945.

Ribbon devices
Citations (same as the Croix de guerre 1914-1918):
 A bronze star (etoile en bronze) for regimental or brigade level citations.
 A silver star (etoile en argent) for divisional level citations.
 A silver-gilt star (etoile en vermeil) for corps level citations.
 A bronze palm (palme en bronze) for army level citations.
 A silver palm (palme en argent) represents five bronze ones.

Notable recipients (partial list)
General Maxime Weygand
Military nurse Geneviève de Galard
General Philippe François Marie, comte de Hauteclocque
General Jacques Émile Massu
Major Hélie Denoix de Saint Marc
Admiral Sir Manley Laurence Power (UK)
General Jacques Pâris de Bollardière
Colonel Jean Sassi
General Mariano Francisco Julio Goybet
General Edgard de Larminat
Brigadier General Jean Raoux
General Paul-Jean-Louis Azan
General Marcel "Bruno" Bigeard
General Alphonse Pierre Juin
Lieutenant Colonel Prince Dimitri Zedguinidze-Amilakhvari
Brigadier General Pierre Charles Albert Marie Langlais
Admiral Georges Thierry d'Argenlieu
Lieutenant Colonel Pierre Paul Jeanpierre
Lieutenant Bernard de Lattre de Tassigny
Major Barthélémy "Rémy" Raffali
Colonel Peter J. Ortiz, USMCR

See also
Croix de guerre 1914–1918 (France)
Croix de guerre 1939–1945 (France)
Croix de guerre (Belgium)

References

External links
 France Phaléristique (in French)

Military awards and decorations of France
Courage awards
Awards established in 1921
French campaign medals
1921 establishments in France
Aftermath of World War I in France
Military awards and decorations of the Gulf War